Brooke is a Virginia Railway Express station located at 1721 Brooke Road in Brooke near Stafford, Virginia. Free parking is available and located on a hill leading from the road. The station serves the Fredericksburg Line and shares the right-of-way with Amtrak's Northeast Regional,  Silver Meteor, Silver Star, Auto Train, Palmetto, and Carolinian trains; however, no Amtrak trains stop here.

References

External links 
Brooke VRE Station

Transportation in Stafford County, Virginia
Virginia Railway Express stations
Buildings and structures in Stafford County, Virginia
Railway stations in the United States opened in 1992
1992 establishments in Virginia